Nihalgarh  is a village in Kapurthala district of Punjab State, India. The village is administrated by a Sarpanch who is an elected representative of village as per the constitution of India and Panchayati raj (India).

Demography 
According to the report published by Census India in 2011, Nihalgarh has 92 houses with the total population of 479 persons of which 250 are male and 229 females. Literacy rate of  Nihalgarh is 78.14%, higher than the state average of 75.84%.  The population of children in the age group 0–6 years is 49 which is 10.23% of the total population.  Child sex ratio is approximately 1130, higher than the state average of 846.

Population data

References

External links
  Villages in Kapurthala
 Kapurthala Villages List

Villages in Kapurthala district